Classica Corsica was an elite men's road bicycle racing event held in 2015 on the island of Corsica, a region of France. It was run two days before the Critérium International stage race, which had been held on Corsica every year since 2010. The Classica itself was a legacy event of the 2013 Tour de France, when the race held its Grand Départ and first three stages on the island. The event was UCI 1.1 rated and was part of the 2015 UCI Europe Tour. The route of the race saw the riders depart Ajaccio and finish in Bastia after  taking in the Col de Vizzavona and the Col de Bellagranajo, before flattening out in the second half of the stage, which represented essentially a reverse running of the second stage from the 2013 Tour.

Winners

References

External links
  

Cycle races in France
UCI Europe Tour races
Recurring sporting events established in 2015
2015 establishments in France
Recurring sporting events disestablished in 2015
2015 disestablishments in France